Boštjan Koritnik (born 15 June 1979) is a Slovenian politician. , he is Minister of Public Administration in the 14th Government of Slovenia.

References 

Living people
1979 births
Place of birth missing (living people)
Government ministers of Slovenia
21st-century Slovenian politicians